Richard E. Aaron (April 23, 1949 – December 8, 2016) was a music photographer. In a career that spanned over three decades, Aaron's media ranged across feature films, television, menus, video, corporate public relations, entertainment publicity and album covers.

Career 
Aaron photographed approximately 4,000 musical artists over his career. He photographed Prince, David Bowie, Freddie Mercury, James Brown, Led Zeppelin, Bob Marley, the Sex Pistols, the Who, members of the Beatles, among many other legendary acts. Among his most notable shoots was Peter Frampton's 1976 album cover, Frampton Comes Alive! Aaron was the photographer behind Paul McCartney on Time magazine's Paul McCartney/Wings Over America cover. He shot Mick Fleetwood and Fleetwood: The Visitor in Africa (RCA Records). He was awarded an Honorary master's degree from Brooks Institute in 2008.

On December 8, 2016, Aaron died of kidney disease at the age of 67.

References

External links

1949 births
2016 deaths
Deaths from kidney disease
Album-cover and concert-poster artists
20th-century American photographers
School of Visual Arts alumni
Rock music photographers